Kamchatka Oblast was the administrative-territorial unit of the Russian Empire.

History
For the first time the Kamchatka Oblast as part of the Irkutsk governorate was formed on August 23, 1803. The center of the Oblast was appointed Verkhne-Kamchatsk, on April 21, 1812, the administration of the region was transferred to Petropavlovsk harbor. In 1822 the Oblast was abolished. Instead, in the Irkutsk Governorate, the Kamchatka Maritime Administration was established with its center in Petropavlovsk.

In 1849, the Kamchatka Oblast was re-established from the Kamchatka Maritime Administration and the Gizhiginsky District of the Okhotsk Maritime Administration. However, already in 1856, the Kamchatka Oblast was abolished, and its territory became part of the Primorskaya Oblast.

By the law of June 30, 1909, the Kamchatka Oblast was created for the third time. The Oblast included Petropavlovsk, Okhotsk, Gizhiginsky, Anadyr Uyezds and the Commander Islands, separated from the Primorskaya Oblast. At the same time, in the territory of Chukotka (part of the Anadyr Uyezd) the Chukotka Uyezd was formed. In 1922, the Kamchatka Oblast was transformed into the Kamchatka Governorate.

Coat of arms description
"In the silver shield there are three knolls or black fire-breathing mountains (middle one in front of the other two) with a scarlet flame and smoke above them. The shield is crowned with the ancient royal crown and is surrounded by golden oak leaves, connected by the Alexander Ribbon".

Population
According to the census of 1897, the population of the Kamchatka Oblast is sparse in numbers, which is also indicated by the population density, the Commander district is clearly distinguished among the general districts, in which the average population density is 10 times more.

The population of the districts of the Kamchatka Oblast for 1897:

Oblast administration

1st period (1803–1822)
Rulers

2nd period (1849–1856)
Military Governor

3rd period (1909–1922)
Governors

Vice Governors

References

Oblasts of the Russian Empire
1803 establishments